The second season of the American television science fiction comedy series The Neighbors premiered on September 20, 2013, on ABC, after being renewed for a second season on May 11, 2013. The series was created by Dan Fogelman and produced by Fogelman, Chris Koch, Aaron Kaplan, John Hoberg, Kat Likkel, Kristin Newman, Kirker Butler, and Jeffrey Morton. The series follows the Weavers (Jami Gertz, Lenny Venito, Max Charles, Isabella Cramp, and Clara Mamet), a family of humans who relocate to a gated community, which happens to be inhabited by aliens, such as the Bird-Kersees (Simon Templeman, Toks Olagundoye, Ian Patrick, and Tim Jo).

Cast

Main cast
 Jami Gertz as Debbie Weaver (22 episodes)
 Lenny Venito as Marty Weaver (22 episodes)
 Simon Templeman as Larry Bird (22 episodes)
 Toks Olagundoye as Jackie Joyner-Kersee (22 episodes)
 Max Charles as Max Weaver (18 episodes)
 Isabella Cramp as Abby Weaver (18 episodes)
 Clara Mamet as Amber Weaver (21 episodes)
 Ian Patrick as Dick Butkus (22 episodes)
 Tim Jo as Reggie Jackson (21 episodes)

Recurring cast
 Megan Park as Jane (9 episodes)
 Patrick O'Sullivan as Johnny Unitas (7 episodes)
 Katherine Tokarz as Mary Lou Retton (4 episodes)
 Alden Villaverde as Kareem Abdul-Jabbar (4 episodes)
 Reginald VelJohnson as Father Kersee (3 episodes)
 Ian Wolterstorff as Keef (2 episodes)
 Meredith Baxter as Mother Joyner (2 episodes)

 Kiersten Lyons as Billie Jean King (4 episodes)
 George Takei as Grandfather (3 episodes)
 Joshua Sasse as DJ Jazzy Jeff (3 episodes)
 Rosalind Chao as Dr. Barbara Hartley (2 episodes)
 Debra Mooney as Theresa Weaver (1 episode)
 Stacy Keach as Dominick Weaver (1 episode)

Guest stars

 Jerry Springer as himself ("Family Conference")
 Lucy Davis as Helen ("The Neighbours")
 Wendy Williams as Shirley ("The One With Interspecies F-R-I-E-N-D-S")
 Barbara Corcoran as herself ("We Jumped the Shark (Tank)")
 Mark Cuban as himself ("We Jumped the Shark (Tank)")
 Robert Herjavec as himself ("We Jumped the Shark (Tank)")
 Daymond John as himself ("We Jumped the Shark (Tank)")

 Kevin O'Leary as himself ("We Jumped the Shark (Tank)")
 Lori Loughlin as Tina Giannulli ("High School Reunion")
 Mark McGrath as John ("High School Reunion")
 Mia Cottet as Collette ("High School Reunion")
 Matthew Del Negro as Rob ("High School Reunion")
 Carrot Top as himself ("Oscar Party")
 Erik Estrada as himself ("Oscar Party")
 Mary Birdsong as Justine ("Oscar Party")

 Rachel Dratch as Pearl ("A Night in (Lou Ferrigno's Hibachi) Heaven")
 Rhea Perlman as Janet ("Uncle Benjamin")
 Bill Nye as himself ("Close Encounters of the Bird Kind")
 Lawrence O'Donnell as himself ("Close Encounters of the Bird Kind")
 Joel Stein as himself ("Close Encounters of the Bird Kind")
 Candace Cameron Bure as Woman ("There Goes the Neighbors' Hood")
 Scott Weinger as Man ("There Goes the Neighbors' Hood")

Episodes

U.S. ratings

References

External links
 
 

The Neighbors (2012 TV series)
2013 American television seasons
2014 American television seasons